The Modular Command Post System (MCPS) is a modular tent system for mobile or temporary tactical operations centers developed in the early-mid 1990s by the United States Army.  The tents are designed to be utilised as a free-standing shelter, or when used with a bootwall, attached to other types of U.S. Army shelters and  tactical vehicles such as variants of the HMMWV (Humvee).

Overview

MCPS is a modular, configurable system utilising standardised interchangeable components that allow the easy transportation, erection and dismantling of a variety of temporary structures that are suitable for deployment in a number of climates, and provide blackout protection for use within forward deployed areas. MCPS tents are available in two colours, camouflage green and desert tan. Each "unit" (i.e. the set of components that comprise one tent) can be configured as:
 single stand-alone structure [Figure 1]
 complex structures comprising multiple MCPS units connected together
 extension structures attached to tactical vehicles

When not in use, units are packed in a dedicated packing containers, which are strapped to a wooden pallet for storage and transportation.

Design

Tent
Each  MCPS tent comprises four exterior fabric walls of identical dimensions that can be arranged as desired. Wall sections are suspended from the roof with a series of male/female quick-connect fasteners, as well as strips of hook and loop fasteners (i.e. velcro). The roof contains two ventilation vents and a stove pipe opening . Walls are available with or without ECU/SHC ducts.   A covered entry way is an integral part of the entrance wall and provides environmental protection and aids good light discipline. When two or more tents are complexed together a rain gutter connects between tents to help water run off. Eight 12-inch steel tent pins (pegs) are issued per unit for staking down the tent frame leg assemblies, and eight 24-inch wooden tent pins are issued for staking down the tent guys lines. 

The system is designed for ease of assembly and minimal labour requirement, utilising quick release fasteners and fixtures throughout. The design distributes loads efficiently with lighter support systems than conventional tents and comprises:
 common roof cover
 three collapsible sections – the entrance wall frame, centre wall frame and end wall frame – made of aluminium tube that unfold and connect to form a single frame [Figure 2]. Frame poles are telescopically height-adjustable for sloping ground.
  interchangeable sidewalls to form different configurations. Types of sidewalls include:
 plain walls
 window walls
 entrance walls
 bootwalls

Erection (set-up) and dismantlement (strike-down) of MCPS units can be accomplished by two persons, with quoted set-up and strike-down times of 20 and 15 minutes respectively.

Optional components
Light coloured wall liners can be fitted to the inside of walls to aide light diffusion and provide basic insulation; they can also be used as outside walls during warm weather and during daylight. Wall liners are either:
 plain for use with plain walls (i.e. no openings)
 with openings for use with window walls 
 with openings for use with entrance walls (can also be used with window walls)

Insulated wall liners are also available for in extreme operating conditions. A light coloured floor can be laid and attached to the walls with a series of male/female quick-connect fasteners.

Bootwalls

Bootwalls are the means by which an MCPS tent is connected to another type of shelter or a tactical vehicle. [Figure 3] depicts a rigid wall shelter (RWS) bootwall for which the components are as follows:
 Polyester bootwall
 Quick-release fasteners
 Hook and loop (Velcro) fastener tapes
 Bootwall end panel
 Roll-up fabric door
 Adjustable RWS belly band
 U-frame (rigid)
 Antenna sleeves
 Securing loops for attaching guy lines

Like the MCPS tents, bootwalls are available in both Camouflage Green ("Class I") and Desert Tan ("Class II").

Packaging

MCPS components are supplied and shipped in dedicated packing bags. Three different types of bags are required for each MCPS unit:
A carrying handle is located at each end and an identification label is sewn on the inside of the bag. "TENT BAG" is stencilled on the side along with a weight limit. Two bags are required for each MCPS unit.
Four pairs of male/female quick-connect fasteners are located along the sides approximately 15.5 inches apart, as well as another pair at each end with 2 inch (5 cm) strips of hook and loop fasteners (i.e. velcro). A carrying handle is located at each end and an identification label is sewn on the inside of the bag along with simplified assembly instructions. "FRAME BAG" is stencilled on the side along with a weight limit. One bag is required for each MCPS unit.
The bag is secured with tie straps, and one bag is required for each MCPS unit.

Once packed, the bags can be strapped to a standard wooden pallet for storage or transportation.

Operational equipment
MCPS units can be fitted with standardised command post equipment of:
 lighting set
 mapboard
 table

Lighting sets and mapboards are suspended from the tent frame.

Variants
MCPS tents are available in two different types:

Type I

The Type I MCPS is the original design equipped with uninsulated wall liners only, and does not have provisions to accommodate a convective space heater (SHC) or ECU ducts. Door openings are offset from the centre, and are fitted with a standard TEMPER vestibule. Type I units are free-standing only i.e. they cannot be attached to vehicles or structures others than other MCPS tents, to which they be attached together to form a complex of multiple units as depicted in [Figure 4].

Type III
The Type III MCPS is a later design fitted with plain and window walls that may accommodate SHC and ASH ducting, and full set of insulated liners is shipped with the tent. An entrance wall with a centrally located door opening may be fitted with a standard TEMPER vestibule, or replaced with  a bootwall to attach the tent to vehicles or other structures.

Use

Stand-alone

Both Type I and Type III MCPS units can be configured as stand-alone tents, either as individual units or joined together to form a complex of multiple units.

To other shelters
When used with appropriate bootwalls, Type III MCPS units can be attached to other U.S. Army shelters including:
 Rigid wall shelters (RWS)
 S-250 Shelter, Non-Expandable (NSN 5411-00-999-4935) 
 S-787 Standardized Integrated Command Post System (SICPS) RWS (NSN 5411-01-333-0663)
 S-832 Shelter, Non-Expandable, Lightweight, Multipurpose (NSN 5411-01-436-3326)
Non-rigid shelters (tents)
 Tent, Extendable, Modular, Personnel (TEMPER)
 Modular General Purpose Tent System (MGPTS)

With vehicles
Type III MCPS units are connect to tactical vehicles through the use of a vehicle-specific bootwall that replaces a side wall or end wall. Bootwalls are available for:
 M1037 4x4 Shelter Carrier 
 M1063 Standard Integrated Command Post System Carrier
 M1097 Heavy HMMWV
 M1113 HMMWV Expanded Capacity Vehicle

Manufacturers
Various companies manufacture MCPS units according to US Department of Defense contracts. Manufacturers include:
Camel Manufacturing
Eureka Tents
Outdoor Venture Corporation.

Civilian use
The rugged construction and versatility of MCPS units make them popular with civilian buyers, and they are often sold through camping equipment suppliers, military equipment surplus stores and through auctions and auction sites. They are also used by aid agencies for disaster relief and humanitarian aid missions, such as after earthquakes or for internally displaced persons in countries experiencing war.

Specifications
Official specifications are as follows:
 Dimensions 
 Length: 
 Width: 
 Ridge height: 
 Eve height: 
 Floor area: 121 square feet
 Weight: 257 pounds
 Material
 Fabric: water resistant, mildew resistant, 13.5oz polyester duck 
 Colours: Camouflage Green (#483) or Desert Tan (#459)
 Packaging
 Container dimensions: 69x27x28 inches
 Shipping weight: 450–482 pounds
 NATO stock number (NSN)
 Green: 8340-01-323-2454 
 Tan: 8340-01-334-7529
 Set-up/strike-down time (with 2 persons) 
 Set-up: 20 minutes
 Strike-down: 15 minutes

References

United States Army equipment
Military tents